Yelena Anatolyevna Khudashova (born 10 July 1965 in Khabarovsk) is a Russian former basketball player who competed in the 1988 Summer Olympics, in the 1992 Summer Olympics, and in the 2000 Summer Olympics.

References

1965 births
Living people
Russian women's basketball players
Olympic basketball players of the Soviet Union
Olympic basketball players of the Unified Team
Olympic basketball players of Russia
Basketball players at the 1988 Summer Olympics
Basketball players at the 1992 Summer Olympics
Basketball players at the 2000 Summer Olympics
Olympic bronze medalists for the Soviet Union
Olympic gold medalists for the Unified Team
Olympic medalists in basketball
Sportspeople from Khabarovsk
Soviet women's basketball players
Medalists at the 1992 Summer Olympics
Medalists at the 1988 Summer Olympics